Acervularia is an extinct genus of horn coral. These stationary epifaunal suspension feeders lived during the Silurian (Wenlock and Ludlow ages) and Devonian periods.

Distribution
Fossils of species within this genus have been found in the Devonian of United States and in the Silurian of Canada, Norway, Sweden, Ukraine and United Kingdom.

References

Tabulata
Prehistoric cnidarians
Paleozoic invertebrates of North America
Paleozoic invertebrates of Europe